Jonathan Adriaan Fourie (born 23 August 1939) is a South African professional golfer.

Fourie was born in Johannesburg. He turned professional in 1970 and spent his career playing mainly on the Southern Africa Tour and the European Tour. He won ten times on the Southern Africa Tour, including one win as an amateur, and led the Order of Merit in 1973/74. In Europe he won the 1977 Callers of Newcastle tournament and twice finished in the top twenty on the European Tour Order of Merit. He joined the European Seniors Tour in its 1992 debut season, and won the Senior British Open and the Belfast Telegraph Irish Senior Masters on his way to winning that tour's order of merit. He continued to play on the seniors tour into his mid sixties.

Professional wins (12)

European Tour wins (1)

European Tour playoff record (1–0)

Sunshine Tour wins (8)
1972 State Mines Open
1973 Transvaal Open, Rothmans Medal 
1974 Western Province Open
1975 Vavasseur International Natal Open,  Dunlop Masters
1977 Newcastle Open, Botswana Pro-Am Open

Other South African wins (1)
1970 South African Masters (as an amateur)

Senior PGA Tour wins (1)

European Senior Tour wins (2)

European Senior Tour playoff record (0–2)

Results in major championships

Note: Fourie only played in The Open Championship.

CUT = missed the half-way cut
"T" = tied

Senior major championships

Wins (1)

Team appearances
Amateur
Eisenhower Trophy (representing South Africa): 1966, 1968, 1970
Commonwealth Tournament (representing South Africa): 1967

References

External links

South African male golfers
Sunshine Tour golfers
European Tour golfers
European Senior Tour golfers
Winners of senior major golf championships
Golfers from Johannesburg
Sportspeople from Pretoria
1939 births
Living people